Emmett Felix Ryan (1897–1963) was an Australian Rugby League player who played in the 1910s and 1920s who represented New South Wales and Australia. He has been named as one of the greatest players in the history of the Newtown Jets.

Background
Ryan was born in Sydney, New South Wales on 27 September 1897 to Thomas Felix Ryan (1861−1927) and Bridget Emma Ryan nee Mulquinny (1863−1920).

Playing career
Ryan played ten seasons for Newtown between 1914 and 1923. Learning the game with teammates such as Charles 'Boxer' Russell, Albert 'Ricketty' Johnston and Paddy McCue, 

Ryan went on to captain the club and play for New South Wales on eight occasions, and Australia. He initially toured with the Australian side to New Zealand in 1919, and also toured with the 1921–22 Kangaroo tour of Great Britain, in which he played two tests. He is listed on The Australian Players Register as Kangaroo No. 101. He retired in 1923 having played over 120 games for Newtown.

Ryan died on 14 March 1963, aged 65.

References

1897 births
1963 deaths
Newtown Jets players
Australian rugby league players
Australia national rugby league team players
New South Wales rugby league team players
Rugby league players from Sydney